Adam Purpis (Russian: Адам Пурпис; sometimes transliterated as "Purpiss"; born 14 March 1883), a Latvian, was a Soviet intelligence agent. Purpis sometimes travelled on a Honduras passport. In the late 1930s, he was head of a front company in Tientsin, the Far Eastern Fur Trading Company.

Arnold Deutsch, the NKVD agent who recruited Kim Philby and ran the Cambridge Four in the mid-1930s, was, at one stage, an assistant to Purpis (see here).

References

1883 births
Year of death missing
Soviet spies